Chaffey Adult School is a public secondary school in Ontario, California. It is one of the eleven schools of the Chaffey Joint Union High School District and the only community day school.

Notes

External links
 Chaffey Adult School
 Chaffey Joint Union High School District

References
 
 

High schools in San Bernardino County, California
Public high schools in California